Middy may refer to:

 A middy blouse, an item of Sailor dress worn by girls and young women in the early twentieth century;
 The Mid-Suffolk Light Railway, an English railway company operating in the first half of the twentieth century;
 A half pint beer glass, a term used in certain states of Australia.

People with the forename
Middy Morgan (1828-1892), Irish-born American  livestock expert